Muhidin Issa Michuzi is a Tanzanian photojournalist who is well known for initiating the Michuzi Blog.

Early life and career
Michuzi had a keen interest in photography. In the 1980s, he joined an evening photography course at the Goethe-Institut in Dar es Salaam. One of his photographs was selected for the front page of the Daily News, a government-owned newspaper. He was subsequently employed as a stringer for three years before being employed formally on 1 January 1990.

In 1992, he joined the Internationales Institut für Journalismus in Berlin for an advanced photojournalism course. He later joined the Tanzania School of Journalism (present-day School of Journalism and Mass Communication) at the University of Dar es Salaam and graduated in 1996.

In 2006 he was awarded a scholarship to attend a specialized course in digital photography in Cardiff, Wales and has since been associated with the Daily News.

Blogging career
In September 2005, Michuzi had accompanied the former Tanzanian foreign minister Jakaya Kikwete who was attending the Helsinki Conference in Finland. There, he met Ndesanjo Macha who assisted him in setting up his blog. The first blog entry was made on 8 September 2005. His intention was to inform the Tanzanian diaspora about news related to the motherland via a photoblog.

Personal life
Michuzi has two brothers, Ahmad and Othman who are also well known bloggers in Tanzania. Together, they've formed a media company known as Michuzi Media Group (MMG). He is an avid fan of Bongo Flava and supports the Premier League club Liverpool F.C. and Pan African at home.

References

External links

Living people
Tanzanian journalists
Tanzanian bloggers
Tanzanian Muslims
University of Dar es Salaam alumni
Tanzanian men by occupation
Tanzanian mass media people
Tanzanian people in arts occupations
1980 births